Jamie Lennon (born 9 May 1998) is an Irish professional footballer playing for League of Ireland Premier Division club St Patrick's Athletic, the club where he started his professional career.

Club career

Youth career
Lennon spent seven years in the youth setup of Shelbourne but was let go ahead of his first year at under 19 level. It was then that he made the move to Dublin rivals St Patrick's Athletic in 2016, where he played at under 19 level for two years. At Pats he captained the side as they reached the league final but lost out to Bohemians at Dalymount Park on 1 November 2017.

St Patrick's Athletic
Lennon made his first team debut on 8 August 2017, starting a Leinster Senior Cup game against Firhouse Clover, scoring after 15 minutes when he smashed a shot into the top corner from 30 yards to help his side to a 2–1 win. He went on to make a second first team appearance that season, playing the full 90 minutes again as Pats lost 1–0 to Shelbourne in the next round of the Leinster Senior Cup On 19 December 2017, ahead of the 2018 season Lennon signed his first professional contract with the first team.

Lennon made his League of Ireland Premier Division debut on 26 February 2018 in a 2–0 loss to Waterford, replacing Owen Garvan after 50 minutes. His first league start came in Pats next game, a 1–0 win away to Bohemians. After his first start, he cemented his place in the team earning great plaudits from manager Liam Buckley as he ended the season with 36 appearances in all competitions with all but 3 of those being in the starting XI, as the Saints finished up in 5th place. For his performances, Lennon was voted as St Patrick's Athletic Young Player of the Year by the club's supporters.

On 7 December 2018 it was announced that Lennon had signed a contract extension for the 2019 season.

On 28 November 2021 Lennon was part of the starting XI in the 2021 FAI Cup Final, beating rivals Bohemians 4–3 on penalties following a 1–1 draw after extra time in front of a record FAI Cup Final crowd of 37,126 at the Aviva Stadium.

Lennon started in the 2022 President of Ireland's Cup against Shamrock Rovers at Tallaght Stadium on 11 February 2022, as his side lost 5–4 on penalties after a 1–1 draw.

On 21 November 2022, it was announced that Lennon had signed a new multi-year contract with the club, turning down interest from clubs in the US and other countries to stay at the club where he started his career.

International career
On 24 January 2019, Lennon was called up to a Republic of Ireland U21 home-based squad by newly appointed manager Stephen Kenny, for a friendly against the Ireland Amateur squad. Lennon received great plaudits as he captained the side as they won 1–0 at Whitehall Stadium on 6 February 2019. On 13 March 2019, Lennon was named in his first competitive underage international side as he was called up to the full Republic of Ireland U21 side for their 2021 UEFA European Under-21 Championship qualification game against Luxembourg U21 at Tallaght Stadium. Lennon came off the bench for Jayson Molumby in the 77th minute of a 3–0 win to earn his first international cap. On 21 May 2019, Lennon was called up to the Ireland Under-21 side for the prestigious 2019 Toulon Tournament in France where they were drawn against China, Mexico and Bahrain. On 18 November 2020, Lennon scored his first international goal, scoring the winner away to Luxembourg in a UEFA European Under-21 Championship qualifier.

Career statistics

Honours

Club
FAI Cup: (1)
2021

Individual
St Patrick's Athletic Young Player of the Year: (1)
2018

References

External links
 
 
 

1998 births
Living people
Association footballers from County Dublin
Association footballers from Dublin (city)
Republic of Ireland association footballers
Shelbourne F.C. players
St Patrick's Athletic F.C. players
League of Ireland players
Association football midfielders
Republic of Ireland youth international footballers
Republic of Ireland under-21 international footballers